"Anyone Else" is a song written by Radney Foster, and recorded by American country music artist Collin Raye.  It was released in January 1999 as the third and final single from Raye's 1998 album The Walls Came Down.  The song reached No. 4 on the Billboard Hot Country Singles & Tracks chart in May 1999 and No. 1 on the RPM Country Tracks chart in Canada.

Chart performance
"Anyone Else" debuted at number 66 on the U.S. Billboard Hot Country Singles & Tracks for the week of January 30, 1999.

Year-end charts

References

1998 songs
1999 singles
Collin Raye songs
Songs written by Radney Foster
Song recordings produced by Paul Worley
Song recordings produced by Billy Joe Walker Jr.
Epic Records singles